Alexandria Bockfeldt Dahl (born 1982), known as Alex Dahl, is an American/Norwegian crime novelist who writes in the Nordic noir genre. Her works have been translated into twelve languages, and she was described by Norwegian newspaper Dagbladet in 2019 as a new star of Nordic noir literature.

Background

She was born in Oslo to a Norwegian father and an American mother, and grew up in West End Oslo. She is a native speaker of both Norwegian and English. She studied Russian, German and international studies in Oslo and Moscow, before earning a creative writing degree from Bath Spa University and a management degree from the University of Bath. She lives in London.

Work
Her first novel, Før jeg forlater deg (Before I Leave You), was published in Norwegian under the name Alexandra Bockfeldt in 2013.

In 2018 her first English-language novel, The Boy at the Door, was published by Penguin Random House. The book was one of the most widely sold e-books in England at the time and was described by The Times as one of "the best crime fiction" books published in 2018. It has been translated into ten languages.

In 2019 she published the novel The Heart Keeper.

Bibliography
 2013 – Før jeg forlater deg, Juritzen Forlag
 2018 – The Boy at the Door, Penguin Random House
 2019 – The Heart Keeper, Penguin Random House
2020- 'Playdate'

References

1982 births
Writers from Oslo
Norwegian-language writers
English-language writers
Norwegian crime fiction writers
21st-century Norwegian novelists
Living people
Norwegian women novelists